Hugh Coveney (20 July 1935 – 14 March 1998) was an Irish Fine Gael politician who served as Minister of State at the Department of Finance from 1996 to 1997, Minister for the Marine and Minister for Defence from 1994 to 1995 and Lord Mayor of Cork from 1982 to 1983. He served as a Teachta Dála (TD) for the Cork South-Central constituency from 1981 to 1982, 1982 to 1987 and 1994 to 1998.

Early life
Coveney was born into one of Cork's prosperous "merchant prince" families in 1935. He was educated at Christian Brothers College, Cork, Clongowes Wood College and the Royal Institute of Chartered Surveyors. He worked as a chartered quantity surveyor before entering politics.

Political career
Coveney served as Lord Mayor of Cork from 1982 to 1983. He was first elected to Dáil Éireann as a Fine Gael TD for the Cork South-Central constituency at the 1981 general election. He lost his seat in the first general election of 1982 but regained it in the second election in the same year. He lost his seat again at the 1987 general election and did not contest the 1992 general election. He was elected to the Dáil again in 1994 following a by-election.

He was first appointed to the Cabinet in 1994 under Taoiseach John Bruton. Coveney was appointed Minister for Defence and Minister for the Marine. However, he was demoted to a junior ministry the following year after allegations of improper contact with businessmen.

Yachting
Coveney's yacht Golden Apple of The Sun (designed by Cork-based designer Ron Holland) was a successful competitor in the Admiral's Cup in the 1970s.

A later  yacht Golden Apple was used by the family for the "Sail Chernobyl" project. The family sailed around the world to raise €650,000 for the Chernobyl Children's Project, a charity which offers assistance to children affected by the 1986 Chernobyl disaster.

Death
In March 1998, it became publicly known that the Moriarty Tribunal had questioned Coveney about whether he had a secret offshore account with Ansbacher Bank, a bank which had become notorious for facilitating tax-evasion. Ten days later, on 13 March 1998, Coveney visited his solicitor to change his will. The next day, 14 March 1998, Coveney died in a fall from a seaside cliff while out walking alone. His son, Simon Coveney, insisted that his father had never held an Ansbacher account. It later emerged that Hugh Coveney had $175,000 on deposit in the secret Cayman Island-based bank. The account was closed in 1979.

His son, Simon, was elected a TD to succeed his father in the resulting by-election on 3 November 1998. He is a former Tánaiste.

See also
Families in the Oireachtas

References

 

1935 births
1998 deaths
Fine Gael TDs
Irish male sailors (sport)
Local councillors in Cork (city)
Lord Mayors of Cork
Members of the 22nd Dáil
Members of the 24th Dáil
Members of the 27th Dáil
Members of the 28th Dáil
Ministers for Defence (Ireland)
People educated at Clongowes Wood College
Politicians from County Cork
Ministers of State of the 27th Dáil
People educated at Christian Brothers College, Cork